The Water Music is a collection of orchestral movements, often published as three suites, composed by George Frideric Handel. It premiered on 17 July 1717, in response to King George I's request for a concert on the River Thames.

Structure
The Water Music opens with a French overture and includes minuets, bourrées, and hornpipes. It is divided into three suites:

Suite in F major (HWV 348)

Overture (Largo – Allegro)
 Adagio e staccato
 Allegro – Andante – Allegro da capo
 Passepied
 Air
 Minuet
 Bourrée
 Hornpipe
 Andante
 Allegro 
 Hornpipe

Suite in D major (HWV 349)
 Overture (Allegro)
 Alla Hornpipe
 Lentement 
 Bourrée 
 Minuet

Suite in G major (HWV 350)
 Sarabande
 Rigaudon
 Menuet 
 Gigue

There is evidence for the different arrangement found in Chrysander's Gesellschaft edition of Handel's works (in volume 47, published in 1886), where the movements from the "suites" in D and G were mingled and published as one work with HWV 348. This sequence derives from Samuel Arnold's first edition of the complete score in 1788 and the manuscript copies dating from Handel's lifetime. Chrysander's edition also contains an earlier version of the first two movements of HWV 349 in the key of F major composed in 1715 (originally scored for two natural horns, two oboes, bassoon, strings, and continuo), where in addition to the horn fanfares and orchestral responses, the original version contained an elaborate concerto-like first violin part.

The music in each of the suites has no set order today.

First performance
The first performance of the Water Music is recorded in The Daily Courant, the first British daily newspaper. At about 8 p.m. on Wednesday, 17 July 1717, King George I and several aristocrats boarded a royal barge at Whitehall Palace, for an excursion up the Thames toward Chelsea. The rising tide propelled the barge upstream without rowing. Another barge, provided by the City of London, transported about 50 musicians who performed Handel's music. Many other Londoners also took to the river to hear the concert. According to The Courant, "the whole River in a manner was covered" with boats and barges. On arriving at Chelsea, the king left his barge, then returned to it at about 11 p.m. for the return trip. The king was so pleased with Water Music that he ordered it to be repeated at least three times, both on the trip upstream to Chelsea and on the return, until he landed again at Whitehall.

King George's companions in the royal barge included Anne Vaughan, Duchess of Bolton, Harriet Pelham-Holles, Duchess of Newcastle-upon-Tyne, Evelyn Pierrepont, 1st Duke of Kingston-upon-Hull, Sophia von Kielmansegg, Countess of Darlington, Henrietta Godolphin, 2nd Duchess of Marlborough, and George Douglas-Hamilton, 1st Earl of Orkney.

Handel's orchestra is believed to have performed from about 8 p.m. until well after midnight, with only one break while the king went ashore at Chelsea.

It was rumoured that the Water Music was composed to help King George refocus London's attention from his son and heir (later George II of Great Britain), who, worried that his time to rule would be shortened by his father's long life, threw lavish parties and dinners to compensate for it; the Water Music's first performance on the Thames was the King's way of reminding London that he was still there and showing he could carry out gestures even grander than his son's.

Subsequent performances
The Water Music is scored for a relatively large orchestra, making it suitable for outdoor performance. It is also performed in indoor concerts and has been regularly programmed.

In 1920 the Irish musician Hamilton Harty made an arrangement of some of the movements for the modern orchestra.
Such re-orchestrations were normal at the time.  According to the conductor Sir Thomas Beecham:

In recent years, performers have tended to avoid versions such as that of Hamilton Harty, being influenced by ideas regarding historically informed performance.

Legends
Legend has it that Handel composed Water Music to regain the favour of King George I. Handel had been employed by the future king George while he was still Elector of Hanover, before he succeeded to the British throne. The composer supposedly fell out of favour for moving to London during Queen Anne's reign. This story was first related by Handel's early biographer John Mainwaring; although it may have some foundation in fact, the tale as told by Mainwaring has been doubted by some Handel scholars.

Another version has it that the Elector of Hanover approved of Handel's permanent move to London, knowing the separation between them would be temporary. Certainly both were aware the Elector of Hanover would eventually succeed to the British throne after Queen Anne's death.

Popular culture and the media

Many portions of Water Music have become familiar in popular culture.

From 1958 to 1988, this was featured as the theme music for Anglia Television, a regional franchise for the East of England by ITV.

Captain Peter Pulcer of the SS Edmund Fitzgerald from 1966 to 1971 was noted for playing this tune over the ship's public address system as it passed through locks in the Great Lakes and connecting canals.

From 1977 to 1996, Walt Disney World featured movements from both installments of Water Music as the background music for the Electrical Water Pageant, a parade of sea creatures lit up with electric lights off the coast of the Magic Kingdom.

From 1983 to 1997, a movement of the music (Bourrée) was used as the theme music to the PBS television show The Frugal Gourmet.

A performance of Water Music plays a major role in the movie The Madness of King George, in which King George III exhibits very erratic and inappropriate behavior at a concert, yelling at the orchestra to play louder (and eventually taking the place of the harpsichordist, playing very badly), culminating in a physical altercation with the Prince of Wales, leading to the Prince of Wales asking to be named Regent.

The “Water Music” appears prominently in the 2003 Baby Einstein video Baby Neptune.

Recordings
There are many recordings. The Music for the Royal Fireworks (1749), composed 32 years later for another outdoor performance (this time, for George II of Great Britain for the fireworks in London's Green Park, on 27 April 1749), has often been paired with the Water Music on recordings.

Hamilton Harty's re-orchestration was used in some earlier recordings of the Water Music. In 1956 the Australian conductor Charles Mackerras recorded this version, but he later changed his approach to Handel turning to the composer's original orchestration (his 1959 recording of the Music for the Royal Fireworks being seen as something of a watershed). Recent recordings are generally influenced by historically informed performance.

There is a chamber version of the score known as the Oxford Water Music. The title comes from the location of the manuscript rather than the assumed place of performance: the arrangement was possibly intended by Handel for performance at Cannons by the band of his patron the Duke of Chandos. It has been recorded on the Avie label.

References

External links
 

Suites by George Frideric Handel
European court festivities
1717 compositions
Culture associated with the River Thames